Don Webb (born April 30, 1960) is an American science fiction and mystery writer, as well as an author of several books on Left Hand Path occult philosophy.  He is also a former High Priest of the Temple of Set.

Writing career
Webb's first professional fiction sale was the short story "Rhinestone Manifesto", published in Interzone 13, Autumn 1985. He is best known for weird, experimental, and offbeat fiction, as well as works inspired by H. P. Lovecraft and according to Locus Magazine, he has published many stories, essays, interviews and other writing materials. His short stories have appeared or been referenced in numerous anthologies, including The Year's Best Science Fiction: Eleventh Annual Collection, Asimov's Science Fiction and The Magazine of Fantasy & Science Fiction  His story "The Great White Bed" (F&SF May 2007) was nominated for the International Horror Critics Award.

Webb has published 12 books and over 400 other items covering a broad range of topics.  Webb is a member of the Turkey City Writer's Workshop.  He currently lives in Austin, Texas and teaches creative writing at the University of California, Los Angeles.

Magico-religious activities

Webb served as High Priest of the Temple of Set from 1993 to 2002.  He is an authority regarding the Temple of Set and has published several works of non-fiction on the topic. The Temple of Set continues to publish several of his articles as recommended introductory material for prospective members.

Within the Temple of Set he is Grand Master of the Order of Setne Khamuast. This Order focuses upon Egyptian and Mediterranean magick and initiation. The working formula of this Order is to take what has worked in the past and make it work today, the idea being that returning to the root of a concept yields the most powerful and precise results for the practitioner.

Bibliography

Books
Fiction

Judas Payne: A Weird Western / Webb's Weird Wild West: Western Tales of Horror (double book with Michael Hemmingson, Wildside Press, 2010) 
When They Came (Temporary Culture, 2006) 
Endless Honeymoon (St. Martin's Minotaur, 2001) 
Essential Saltes (St. Martin's Press, 1999) 
Serenade at the End of Time (Bereshith Pub, January 1999)
The Explanation and Other Good Advice (Wordcraft of Oregon, 1998) 
The Double: An Investigation (St. Martin's Press, 1998) 
Anubis on Guard Selected Poetry of Don Webb (Dark Regions Press 1998)
Stealing My Rules (CyberPsychos AOD Books, 1997) 
A Spell for the Fulfillment of Desire (Black Ice Books, 1996) 
The Seventh Day and After (Wordcraft of Oregon, 1993), 
Märchenland ist abgebrannt: Profane Mythen aus Milwaukee (short story collection, translated by Susanna Harringer, Guthmann-Peterson, 1989)
Uncle Ovid's Exercise Book (Illinois State University Press, Fiction Collective Two, 1987)
The Bestseller and Others (Chris Drumm Publications)
Non-fiction
The Seven Faces of Darkness (Occult non-fiction, Runa-Raven Press) 
Uncle Setnakt's Essential Guide to the Left Hand Path (Occult non-fiction) 
Mysteries of the Temple of Set: Inner Teachings of the Left Hand Path (Occult non-fiction) 
Aleister Crowley: The Fire and the Force (Occult non-fiction) 
Overthrowing the Old Gods: Aleister Crowley and the Book of the Law (Occult non-fiction) 
Set the Outsider (with Judith Page) (Occult non-fiction) 
Uncle SetNakt's Nightbook (Occult non-fiction) 
Energy Magick of the Vampyre (Occult non-fiction) 
How To Become a Modern Magus (Occult non-fiction)

Short fiction
Collections

Stories

 "Tamarii Notebook" (in More Amazing Stories, edited by Kim Mohan, Tor, 1998)
 "Four-and-Twenty" (Originally published in Pulphouse: The Hardback Magazine Issue 7: Spring 1990 (Pulphouse Publishing, Spring 1990)
 "The Key to the Mysteries" (Originally published in Grue Magazine, 1989, collected in The Explanation and Other Good Advice, 1998)
 "In the Wings" (Originally published in Pulphouse: The Hardback Magazine Issue 3: Spring 1989 (Pulphouse Publishing, Spring 1989)
 London is Calling with t. Winter-Damon (Back Brain Recluse, 1989; The Explanation and Other Good Advice collection, Wordcraft of Oregon, 1998)
Pulphouse Issue 19

Non-fiction

Reviews
"Book Becoming Power" by Henry Wessells (New York Review of Science Fiction, March 2000)
"Webb on the Web" by Jon Lebkowsky (The Austin Chronicle, Vol. 17, No. 47, July 31, 1998)

References

External links

Citations for Don Webb in the Locus Index to Science Fiction
 Point of Inquiry interview with Don Webb
"R. A. Lafferty: Effective Arcanum" by Don Webb

1960 births
Living people
20th-century American novelists
21st-century American novelists
American horror writers
American male novelists
American male short story writers
American mystery writers
American science fiction writers
American short story writers
Analog Science Fiction and Fact people
Cthulhu Mythos writers
The Magazine of Fantasy & Science Fiction people
Setians
Writers from Austin, Texas
Novelists from Texas
20th-century American male writers
21st-century American male writers